Jærens rev (Jæren's reef) is the westernmost sandbank on the coast of Jæren, located approximately  off Reve in Klepp municipality, between Orrestranda and Borestranda. Its location has been used to define the limits of the Norwegian fishery zone.

The shoal

The shoal is a partly stony sandbar and extends almost  to the west in front of the Revtangen headland, the westernmost point of Jæren. A first wooden navigation mark was set up here as early as 1854; it was replaced by a steel construction in 1911, which was dismantled in 1994 and only replaced by the current beacon ten years later.<ref>Day mark: See description at Wikimedia Commons picture: "Dagmerke ved Jærens rev. Konstruksjon i rustfritt stål reist av grunneigarar, Klepp historielag og Jærens kystlag 25. august 2004. Høgd 16,5 meter, vekt meir enn 3 tonn. Merket har ein sidekant på fire meter. Første gong reist i 1854 (av tre), andre gong av stål i 1911 og tatt ned i 1994" tr."Daymark at Jærens rev. Stainless steel construction erected by landowners, Klepp history team and Jæren's coastal team on 25 August 2004. Height 16.5 meters, weight more than 3 tonnes. The mark has a side edge of four meters. The first marker was erected in 1854 (of wood), the second marker of steel in 1911 and taken down in 1994</ref>

About  further north-northeast is the Feistein Lighthouse on the small Feistein archipelago, at 58°49′35″N 05°30′19″E.

Wildfowl
Jæren's rev is a very well known locality for waders, and since 1937 Stavanger Museum has had an ornithological station (Revtangen Ornithological Station) on the mainland nearby.  The Norwegian Air Force took possession of parts of the site in the 1950s as a target area for bombs and gunfire, and the ornithological station was therefore relocated in the autumn of 1954 about  further northeast, to a point near the Reve farms, where it is still located today. Every year between 6,000 and 12,000 waders and passerines are caught there, ringed and then released again. Almost 300 different bird species have been observed there since its opening.

Wrecks
The reef has been the scene of many shipwrecks along the harsh Jær coast. In his book «Skipsforlis rundt Jæren» (tr. "Shipwreck around Jæren"), Erik Bakkevig writes of 394 shipwrecks along the Jæren coast over the years.

The Norwegian cargo ship MS Knute Nelson'' sank at Jærens rev on 27 September 1944, together with two other ships in the same Axis forces convoy, which encountered a French-laid minefield.

Rescue station
A rescue station was established here in 1852, and remained in operation until 1993.

References

Jæren